Mamoori or Mamuri is a town and union council of Dera Ghazi Khan District in the Punjab province of Pakistan. It is located at 29°54'57N 70°33'52E and has an altitude of 115 metres (380 feet).

References

Populated places in Dera Ghazi Khan District
Union councils of Dera Ghazi Khan District
Cities and towns in Punjab, Pakistan